FlyWhoosh was a company that operated scheduled services to Dundee, Birmingham and Belfast before ceasing operations. Flywhoosh is a trading name of BluArrow Aviation Ltd.

History
The company had been established by Birmingham-based businessman, Aden Murcutt, representing the travel company Bluearrow/Govisit who sold the tickets. Murcutt had previously tried to set up Flywho as a transatlantic charter airline. The operation used the services and licences of the Polish charter airline White Eagle Aviation which supplied an ATR 42 aircraft and crews. Scheduled services commenced on 29 May 2007 and were suspended on 7 December 2007.

Destinations 

FlyWhoosh operated scheduled services to the following destinations (at June 2007):

England
Birmingham (Birmingham International Airport)

Northern Ireland
 Belfast (Belfast City Airport)

Scotland
 Dundee (Dundee Airport)

See also
 List of defunct airlines of the United Kingdom

References

Defunct airlines of the United Kingdom
Airlines established in 2007
Airlines disestablished in 2007
British companies established in 2007